The Amazon Cooperation Treaty Organization (ACTO) is an international organization aimed at the promotion of sustainable development of the Amazon Basin. Its member states are: Bolivia, Brazil, Colombia, Ecuador, Guyana, Peru, Suriname and Venezuela.

The Amazon Cooperation Treaty (ACT) was signed on 3 July 1978 and amended in 1998. ACTO was created in 1995 to strengthen the implementation of the Treaty. The Permanent Secretariat was later established in Brasilia in 2002.

Members

External links 

International environmental organizations
International organizations based in the Americas
Amazon basin
Intergovernmental organizations established by treaty